Charles Calvin Yancey (born December 28, 1948, in Boston, Massachusetts, United States) is a former member of the Boston City Council. He represented Mattapan and parts of Dorchester. He served as City Council president in 2001. He unsuccessfully ran for mayor in 2013.

Early life and education
Yancey was born at Massachusetts Memorial Hospital in Boston on December 28, 1948, to Howell Yancey Sr. and Alice W. Yancey. He grew up in the Roxbury neighborhood of Boston and was educated in the Boston Public School System.

He attended the Philip Brooks Elementary School, the Patrick T. Campbell Junior High School, and Boston Technical High School. He received his bachelor's degree in Economics from Tufts University in 1970 and a master's degree in Public Administration from Harvard University in 1991. While at Tufts, he helped found the Afro-American Society and the African American Cultural Center.

Career
Yancey was first elected to the Boston City Council in November 1983, representing District 4. Terms on the council are two years; he won a 16th consecutive term in November 2013.

In the 2010s, a pet project of Yancey's was advocating for the creation of a "first class" high school in Mattapan. He voted against the creation of a downtown school in 2013, which was seen as being in protest of the Council's failure to vote approve his proposed Mattapan high school.

In 2011, Yancey was the only member of the Boston City Council to vote against an ordinance requiring fingerprints and criminal records to be provided by individuals applying for certain licenses.

Yancey was a candidate in the 2013 election for Mayor of Boston. In a candidate survey for the mayoral race, Yancey announced positions on issues including keeping a cap on the number of charter schools in Boston, allowing for a citywide vote on a potential casino bid, and increasing the number of street workers in Boston to curb youth violence. He finished 9th in a field of 12 candidates in the preliminary election, earning 2.1% of the total vote.

In November 2015, Yancey was unseated from the council by newcomer Andrea Campbell. Yancey received 38.4% of the vote, compared to Campbell's 61.3%.

Yancey has taught courses in state and local politics at Bunker Hill Community College in Boston, and received an honorary Doctor of Laws degree from Mount Ida College in 2001.

References

Further reading

External links
 Flickr. Photo of Yancey, 2006

Boston City Council members
Tufts University School of Arts and Sciences alumni
Mattapan, Boston
Dorchester, Boston
Living people
1948 births
Harvard Kennedy School alumni
John D. O'Bryant School of Mathematics & Science alumni
People from Roxbury, Boston
African-American city council members in Massachusetts
21st-century African-American people
20th-century African-American people